Craig Federighi (born May 27, 1969) is an American engineer and business executive who is the senior vice president (SVP) of software engineering at Apple Inc. He oversees the development of iOS, iPadOS, macOS and Apple's common operating system engineering teams. His teams are responsible for delivering the software of Apple's products, including the user interface, applications and frameworks.

Early life and education
Federighi was born on May 27, 1969 in San Leandro, California. He graduated from Acalanes High School in Lafayette, California. 

Federighi received a bachelor of science in electrical engineering and computer science and a master of science in computer science from the University of California, Berkeley in 1991 and 1993, respectively.

Career

NeXT and Ariba 
Federighi worked under Steve Jobs at NeXT, where he led development of the Enterprise Objects Framework. He joined Apple when it acquired NeXT in 1996, but then left it in 1999 for Ariba, where held several roles including Chief Technology Officer.

Return to Apple
Federighi returned to Apple in 2009 to lead macOS engineering, at a time when Apple had just finished developing Mac OS X Snow Leopard, which was highly regarded for its focus on speed and quality. In March 2011, Federighi succeeded Bertrand Serlet as vice president of Mac Software Engineering at Apple, and in August 2012 he was promoted to senior vice president, reporting to CEO Tim Cook. Upon Scott Forstall's departure from Apple, his role was expanded to encompass iOS in addition to macOS. In the following decade of Federighi's leadership, many observers noted a marked decline in the quality and security of Apple's software products.

As of September 2016, Federighi was reported to own more than 500,000 shares of Apple stock worth about US$180 million as of June 2020.

Public image 
Within the community of Apple users and developers, Federighi is known for his energetic presentations of new Apple software, frequently featuring absurdist humor such as references to his hair, use of new software features to organize events such as office karaoke parties and camping trips, and his claimed love of the band Rush. A running gag in Federighi’s macOS presentations involves him describing the fictional exploits of the “crack product marketing team,” venturing naked through California in a Volkswagen Minibus and ultimately arriving at the location after which the version of the operating system is named. Federighi has some notable nicknames around Apple, such as "Hair Force One". Additionally, Apple CEO Tim Cook has called him "Superman".

His first appearance onstage during a major Apple event was at WWDC 2009, where he helped Bertrand Serlet introduce Mac OS X Snow Leopard. He made another appearance during 2010's 'Back to the Mac' presentation, showing off Mac OS X Lion. He introduced iOS 7 and OS X Mavericks at Apple's WWDC 2013 developer conference, and iOS 8 and OS X Yosemite at WWDC 2014. At WWDC 2015, he delivered most of Apple's 2-hour main opening-day presentation, introducing iOS 9 and OS X 10.11 "El Capitan", and revealing plans to release Apple's new programming language Swift as an open-source project. In September 2015, he demoed 3D Touch in the new iPhone 6S.

At WWDC 2016, Federighi introduced iOS 10 and macOS 10.12 "Sierra" and said that the 15-year-old OS X would be rebranded as "macOS" in tune with the naming scheme used for iOS, tvOS, and watchOS. He emphasized the use of widgets on the iOS lock screen and announced new APIs for Siri and iMessage that would be open to all developers. In March 2016, Federighi wrote an article for The Washington Post, stating that "I became an engineer because I believe in the power of technology to enrich our lives" as his motivation.

In 2017, Federighi announced that the Safari web browser would block cookies from following people from site to site. 

At an Apple Special Event in September 2017, Federighi initially failed to properly demo the Face ID feature on the iPhone X. Apple stated that before the event, some Apple employees had inadvertently triggered Face ID on one of the demonstration phones, causing it to instead prompt for a passcode when Federighi attempted to unlock it.

At WWDC 2020, he was the lead presenter showcasing many of Apple's recent advancements. He also introduced iOS 14, iPadOS 14, and macOS 11 "Big Sur".

He made a cameo appearance within the September 2020 Apple Event, appearing briefly during a segment. However, he did not speak.

At the November 2020 Apple Special Event, a video of him “setting the mood” by waking a MacBook from sleep instantly became a meme.

In November 2021, he appeared at the Web Summit talking about the dangers of allowing sideloading in the iOS ecosystem

At WWDC 2022, Federighi introduced iOS 16, macOS 13 "Ventura" as well as iPadOS 16.

Personal life
Federighi is of Italian descent. Federighi is married as of 2014 and has four children.

References

Living people
Apple Inc. executives
UC Berkeley College of Engineering alumni
NeXT
American software engineers
American computer scientists
American people of Italian descent
1969 births